Po Leung Kuk Mrs. Ma Kam Ming-Cheung Fook Sien College is a full-time grammar school situated in Tung Chung, Lantau, Hong Kong, beside Fu Tung Estate and Tung Chung station. Dr. Ma Kam Ming, a Po Leung Kuk consultant, donated HK$5 million to finance the establishment of the school in 1997.

Its new wing was inaugurated officially in February 2007 during the celebrations of the 10th anniversary of its founding. Together with the old wing, the 7-story complex comprises a total of 26 standard classrooms, three remedial teaching rooms, four multimedia rooms, and various special rooms. This would allow more spaces for teaching when the '3+3+4' schooling system is implemented in 2009.

Facilities
Computer Room, Multi-Media Learning Centre, Computer-Aided Learning Room, Student Activity Centre, Multi-Purpose Room, Library, Campus TV Studio. The campus is air-conditioned. All classrooms and special rooms are equipped with computers and LCD projectors. Wireless access points are installed, so teachers and students can connect to the Internet anywhere on campus.

Extracurricular activities
Co-curricular activities in the following areas are provided: academic, sport, music, art, social services, and special interest groups. Students are encouraged to set up and lead the groups. The whole school is divided into 4 houses so that a tradition of houses can be established. Every year, we have leadership training camps to teach students organizational skills and how to work independently.

External links

Secondary schools in Hong Kong
Po Leung Kuk
Tung Chung
Educational institutions established in 1997
1997 establishments in Hong Kong